Archeptolis, also Archepolis, was a Governor of Magnesia on the Maeander in Ionia for the Achaemenid Empire circa 459 BCE to possibly around 412 BCE, and a son and successor of the former Athenian general Themistocles.

Governor of Magnesia
Archeptolis minted silver coinage as he ruled Magnesia, just as his father had done, and it is probable that part of his revenues were handed over to the Achaemenids in exchange for the maintenance of their territorial grant.

Archeptolis is said to have married his half-sister Mnesiptolema (daughter of Themistocles from his second wife), homopatric (but not homometric) marriages being permitted in Athens. 

Themistocles and his son formed what some authors have called "a Greek dynasty in the Persian Empire".

Archeptolis had several sisters, named Nicomache, Asia, Italia, Sybaris, and probably Hellas, who married the Greek exile in Persia Gongylos and still had a fief in Persian Anatolia in 399/400 BC as his widow. He also had three brothers, Diocles, Polyeucteus and Cleophantus, the latter possibly a ruler of Lampsacus. One of the descendants of Cleophantus still issued a decree in Lampsacus around 200 BC mentioning a feast for his own father, also named Themistocles, who had greatly benefited the city. 

Later, Pausanias wrote that the sons of Themistocles "appear to have returned to Athens", and that they dedicated a painting of Themistocles in the Parthenon and erected a bronze statue to Artemis Leucophryene, the goddess of Magnesia, on the Acropolis:

They may have returned from Asia Minor in old age, after 412 BC, when the Achaemenids took again firm control of the Greek cities of Asia, and they may have been expelled by the Achaemenid satrap Tissaphernes sometime between 412 and 399 BC. In effect, from 414 BC, Darius II had started to resent increasing Athenian power in the Aegean and had Tissaphernes enter into an alliance with Sparta against Athens, which in 412 BC led to the Persian conquest of the greater part of Ionia.

Coinage

See also
Coins

References

External links 
 

5th-century BC Greek people
Achaemenid satraps of Lydia
Ancient Greek emigrants to the Achaemenid Empire